"One and One Is One" is a song by the British band Medicine Head, written by band member John Fiddler.

Released as a single in 1973, it entered the UK Singles Chart in May, reaching number 3 in June and staying in the charts for 13 weeks.

The arrangement includes a Jew's harp.

Charts

References

External links
 

1973 singles
1973 songs
Medicine Head songs
Polydor Records singles